Phidoloporidae is a family within the bryozoan order Cheilostomatida. The colonies of many genera grow in an upright, reticulate branching manner, which gave rise to one colloquial name for this group as 'lace corals'. Zooids generally open on one side of the branches.

Classification 

This family was previously commonly known as Reteporidae Smitt (1868), which is a junior synonym of Phidoloporidae Gabb & Horn (1862).

 Family Phidoloporidae
 Genus Bryorachis
 Genus Chevron
 Genus Dentiporella
 Genus Dictyochasma
 Genus Fodinella
 Genus Hippellozoon
 Genus Hippopozoon
 Genus Iodictyum
 Genus Lifuella
 Genus Malleatia
 Genus Metacleidochasma
 Genus Phidolopora
 Genus Plesiocleidochasma
 Genus Psileschara
 Genus Psilosecos
 Genus Reteporella
 Genus Reteporellina
 Genus Rhynchozoon
 Genus Schedocleidochasma
 Genus Schizoretepora
 Genus Schizotheca
 Genus Sparsiporina
 Genus Stephanollona
 Genus Strophiella
 Genus Triphyllozoon

References 

Bryozoan families
Cheilostomatida
Extant Paleocene first appearances